Quinn Gleason and Luisa Stefani were the defending champions, but Gleason chose to participate at the 2019 Henderson Tennis Open instead. 

Stefani partnered alongside Hayley Carter and successfully defended her title, defeating Anna Danilina and Conny Perrin in the final, 5–7, 6–3, [10–6].

Seeds

Draw

Draw

References
Main Draw

Copa LP Chile Hacienda Chicureo - Doubles